Maharaja Agrasen Hospital in Bangalore, India, situated in 15 Main, 17 Cross, Padmanabhanagar, South Bangalore, Karnataka – 560070, near Shanimahathma Temple
It is a multi-speciality hospital built in the year 2001 
The hospital is also listed under Practo.

History
Maharaja Agrasen Hospital has been so named because Maharaja Agrasen was a noble king of Agroha (Haryana) in whose heart, the welfare of his subject was the super most. In his kingdom, education and medical facilities were free to everyone irrespective of caste, religion, race and sex etc.

Services
The hospital provides numerous health services starting from Extensor Tendon Repair, endoscopy to fissurectomy, biopsy, X- Ray, Anthroscopy, Diabetes Management etc. Also Open and Laproscopic Hernia surgery is conducted here. Hospital Services are listed here :

 Heart Conditions
  Gastroenterologist
  Chest Pain Treatment
  Urology
  Cardiology
  Diabetology
  Consultation
  Child Specialist
  Grommet Insertion
  General Pediatrics
  Clinical Cardiology
  General dermatology
  Preventive Medicine
  Bone Tumor Treatment
  Ent Checkup (General)
  Paediatric Healthcare
  Uncontrolled Diabetes
  Viral Fever Treatment
  Dengue Fever Treatment
  Skin Disease Treatment
  Treatment For Bone Fracture
  Treatment For Diabetes Management
  Treatment For Obstetrics Problems
  Treatment For Diseases in Pregnancy

The hospital is aiming at opening new departments like IVF (In Vitro Fertilization) and Oncology Healthcare Unit.

Facilities
The hospital has a dialysis facility.

In December 2005, the hospital offered a free diabetes camp.

The below list of facilities are available here.

 EEG
 TMT
 X-ray
 CT Scan
 ECG
 PFT
 ECHO
 Mammogram
 Color Doppler
 Ultrasound
 Endoscopy

Rates

Rates for Hospital Wards at Maharaja Agrasen Hospital varies from approximately Rs 1150/- to Rs 5000/- varying from General Ward, Semi-Private Ward (Twin sharing), Private Ward (both Non-AC & Deluxe Room) to Suite Room. The Hospital conducts several tests and rates are approximately :

References

External links

Hospitals in Bangalore
Memorials to Agrasen
Hospitals established in 2001
2001 establishments in Karnataka